NewsFire is an RSS newsreader developed by David Watanabe for Mac OS X. It supports Atom, RSS, and Podcasting. NewsFire features groups, labels, smart groups, search, and integration with iTunes, Spotlight, and weblog editors. NewsFire can also import and export a blogroll from and to OPML; however, it cannot import Google Reader OPML at this time due to a known bug.

On March 1, 2008, NewsFire became freeware, but since the release of NewsFire 2.0 to the Mac AppStore on February 3, 2011, NewsFire is not freeware anymore.

NewsFire 1.3 requires Mac OS X v10.4.  NewsFire 1.1 was the final version supporting Mac OS X v10.3.

See also
 Comparison of feed aggregators

References

External links

Developer's blog
MacWorld review
A Feb. 2008 blog post where Watanabe discusses the Google Reader bug in the comments
 with last freeware version 1.6 v84

MacOS-only software
Atom (Web standard)
News aggregators
Shareware